Cascade Lake is a lake located north of Inlet, New York. Fish species present in the lake are black bullhead, brook trout, white sucker and yellow perch. There is carry down access on the north shore off a trail from Big Moose Road. No motors are allowed on this lake.

References

Lakes of Hamilton County, New York